Elymnias pealii, or phallic palmfly, is a butterfly in the family Nymphalidae. It was described by James Wood-Mason in 1883. It is endemic to Assam in the Indomalayan realm.

References

External links
"Elymnias Hübner, 1818" at Markku Savela's Lepidoptera and Some Other Life Forms

Elymnias
Butterflies described in 1883